I Can See Your Voice is a British television mystery music game show series based on the South Korean programme of the same name. Since its premiere on 10 April 2021, it has aired two series on BBC One.

Gameplay

Format
Presented with a group of six "mystery singers" identified only by their occupation, a guest artist and a group of two contestants must attempt to eliminate bad singers from the group without ever hearing them sing, assisted by clues and a celebrity panel over the course of four rounds. At the end of the game, the last remaining mystery singer is revealed as either good or bad by means of a duet between them and one of the guest artists.

Rewards
If the singer is good, the contestants win ; if the singer is bad, the same amount is given to the bad singer instead.

Rounds
Each episode presents the guest artist and contestants with six people whose identities and singing voices are kept concealed until they are eliminated to perform on the "stage of truth" or remain in the end to perform the final duet.

Notes:

Production

Background and development
BBC first announced the development of the series in July 2020. It is co-produced by Naked and Thames (both under properties of Fremantle); the staff team is managed by executive producers Tom O'Brien for Naked, and Amelia Brown and Louis Hutchinson for Thames.

Filming
Tapings for the programme took place at The Maidstone Studios, Vinters Park in Maidstone, Kent, in which ITV's rival show Game of Talents also filmed there. The 42nd appeal show of the annual Children in Need charity broadcast conducted a mini-segment of ICSYV at Dock10, MediaCityUK in Salford, Greater Manchester.

In the first series, the programme was filmed under health and safety protocols due to the COVID-19 pandemic.

Broadcast

History
I Can See Your Voice debuted on 10 April 2021, despite programming changes on that day before the demise of Prince Philip. During the first series broadcasts, the show has been already renewed for the second series that premiered on 15 October 2022.

In 14 February 2023, BBC formally discontinued the programme after airing two series.

Special episodes
During the 42nd appeal show of annual Children in Need charity broadcasts on 19 November 2021, the ICSYV segment featured mystery singers Kate Silverton (newsreader), Jason Mohammad (Final Score host), and eventual winner, declared bad singer Mike Bushell (BBC Breakfast presenter).

As a prelude to the second series, Leona Lewis played alongside former gymnast Gabby Logan as contestant in the holiday special on Christmas Eve of 2021.

Series overview

Episodes

Series 1 (2021)

Series 2 (2022)

Specials

Accolades

Notes

References

External links

I Can See Your Voice (British game show)
2020s British game shows
2021 British television series debuts
BBC television game shows
BBC high definition shows
British music television shows
British television series based on South Korean television series
English-language television shows
Television series by Fremantle (company)
Television shows produced by Thames Television